Karlyn is a given name that is a variation of Carlene and Karleen and nickname form of Karla. Notable people known by this name include the following:

Karlyn Pipes (born 1962), American swimmer
Karlyn Kohrs Campbell (born 1937), American academic
Karlyn Bowman, American editor and public opinion analyst

See also

Karalyn Patterson
Karilyn
Karlan (surname)
Karlen
Karlin (surname)
Karolyn
Karyn